Jacques Pottier, (born 17 August 1930, Darnétal, France), is a French operatic lyric tenor and recording artist. He was a Principal Tenor with the Opéra National de Paris.

Career
Pottier entered the Paris Conservatory in 1954, in the class of Ketty Lapeyrette, while taking lessons in Rouen with Rose Pocidalo with whom he made his debut in Werther in 1957. He was also taught by Paul Cabanel, Jean Claverie and Maurice Faure, and after winning a first prize in singing at the Paris Conservatory in 1956, he was awarded a grant to study at the Accademia Musicale Chigiana in Siena, Italy. While there he was noticed by the singer Gina Cigna who invited him to work for her in Milan.

In 1961 Pottier sang at the Opéra de Lille as the Unknown Prince (Calàf) in Turandot. The following year he entered the Opéra National de Paris as Principal Tenor and played the role of An Italian Singer in Der Rosenkavalier, performing with Elisabeth Schwarzkopf. By 1972 he had performed roles in Rigoletto, Carmen, Tosca, Faust, Tannhäuser, Falstaff, Tristan und Isolde, La Bohème, Les Contes d'Hoffmann, I Pagliacci, Cavalleria rusticana, Il trovatore, Aïda, Der fliegende Holländer, Lucia di Lammermoor and Prométhée, and sang in Verdi's Requiem, and Beethoven's Ninth Symphony.

Pottier taught voice in Paris music conservatories at Longjumeau, Viry-Châtillon, Palaiseau and La Celle-Saint-Cloud. In the 1970s he taught French musical artists Dalida, Nicole Croisille, Sheila and Ringo (Guy Bayle),  Thierry Le Luron and Mireille Mathieu. In 1974 he was publicized in an article by Léon Zitrone in the French magazine Jour de France.

In 1982 Pottier appeared in the French television program Bon Anniversiare Juliette, where he played and sang the role of Caruso.

In 1983 he retired to Melbourne, Australia, where he now lives, and has taught singing at Carey Baptist Grammar School, Melbourne Girls Grammar School and at Melbourne University's Music Conservatory.

Recordings
Pottier has recorded Carmen, Faust, La fanciulla del West, and Der fliegende Holländer for the French Radio station ORTF. For Deutsche Grammophon he recorded Girard de Propriac's Les trois déesses rivales or Le judgement de Pâris. Other recordings have been Saint-Saëns Samson et Dalila directed by Georges Prêtre, Perosi's Requiem for the Corelia company, Honegger's Le Roi David directed by Serge Baudo, and  Stravinski's Les Noces directed by Pierre Boulez which received the 1966 Grand Prix du Disque Académie Charles Cros.

In 2000 Pottier recorded in the role of Olivier in the opera Dr Couteau by David Chisholm and in 2002, a four track CD, Four Songs; French Poetry set to music by Alain Jacques with James Cannon playing guitar. The following year he recorded Florilège vol. 1, a further album of 12 French poems, again with Jacques and with the guitar accompaniment of Melchior Martin; songs from the album were played on Special Broadcasting Service Radio in Australia. In 2006, with Jacques as artistic director, he recorded an album of 13 popular French songs: Beloved Songs of France. Later he recorded two albums of Jacques' songs: Florilège vol. 2 (2008) and Beloved French Poetry (2009). In 2010 he completed the album Beloved Opera Arias, again with Jacques.

Pottier's Ah mes amis... from the Opera La Fille du Régiment was broadcast in 2010 during an interview with by Lindsay Cocker on 3MBS FM, Melbourne.

Honours
In 1975 Pottier was, as a member of the  Union Professionnelle des Maîtres du Chant Français, awarded the title "Maître du Chant Français".

He was awarded the French national honours Chevalier de l'Ordre de L’Education Civique and Chevalier de l'Ordre des Arts et des Lettres, reported in the Journal Officiel de la République Française (4 December 1998).

Publications
Pottier's 1991 self-published book, Discover your true voice, describes singing techniques that he has developed over the years.

References 

French operatic tenors
1930 births
Living people
People from Seine-Maritime
Conservatoire de Paris alumni
20th-century French male opera singers